Sithon is a genus of butterflies in the family Lycaenidae. The species of this genus are found in the Indomalayan realm.

Species
Sithon nedymond (Cramer, [1780])
Sithon micea (Hewitson, 1869) Borneo

References

 
Lycaenidae genera
Taxa named by Jacob Hübner